Middle Rio Grande may refer to:
Middle Rio Grande Basin, a hydrological basin in central New Mexico
Middle Rio Grande Valley, the valley created by the river as it traverses the basin
Middle Rio Grande Conservancy District, which manages irrigation and flood control in the Albuquerque basin of central New Mexico
Middle Rio Grande Development Council, a voluntary association of cities, counties and special districts in southern Texas
Middle Rio Grande Project, a set of irrigation, flood control and water conservation facilities in central New Mexico  
Middle Rio Grande Valley AVA, an American Viticultural Area located in the watershed of the Rio Grande in central New Mexico
The middle of the Rio Grande